Mitchell J. Blutt is an American physician-businessman, and one of the first physicians to play a prominent role on Wall Street by drawing on his medical training to identify investment potential in healthcare companies. He is the founder and CEO of the New York-based healthcare investment firm Consonance Capital and a former Executive Partner of J.P. Morgan Partners. He is also a Clinical Assistant Professor of Medicine in the Department of Medicine at Weill Cornell Medicine and the Graduate School of Medical Sciences of Cornell University.

Physician-businessman
A 1978 summa cum laude graduate of the University of Pennsylvania, Blutt created his own undergraduate course of study, the precursor to the biological basis of behavior major. As a graduate of the University of Pennsylvania School of Medicine (1982) he completed his medical residency at the New York Hospital/Cornell Medical School (1985). He held the Robert Wood Johnson Foundation Clinical Scholars Fellowship at Penn while simultaneously receiving his MBA from Wharton (1987). Blutt was hired in 1987 by what became J.P. Morgan Partners. During his 18-year career there he was involved in finding and negotiating acquisitions, primarily in the healthcare industry.

Medicine and business
From 1987 to 1999, Blutt spent four days at his investment office and one day a week at Cornell University Medical Center to teach and tend to patients. He cites his access to a network of medical professionals whose judgment he trusts as an advantage and that companies are often reassured when a physician is involved in negotiations for healthcare related investments.

Consonance Capital
Blutt remains a Clinical Assistant Professor of Medicine at Weill Cornell Medicine. In 2005 he founded Consonance Capital, an investment firm focused on equity investments in the healthcare industry. Consonance Capital went into business in 2005 investing in stocks of small public health-care companies. The hedge fund is managed by Consonance Capital Management. Blutt's original partners in the hedge fund are Dr. Benny Soffer and Kevin Livingston.

Blutt also launched a private equity program managed by Consonance Capital Partners with partners Benjamin Edmands, Stephen McKenna and Nancy-Ann DeParle, who has more than 20 years’ experience as a policy official, private equity investor and corporate board member in the health care industry. DeParle was Administrator of the Centers for Medicare and Medicaid Services under President Bill Clinton and also served as the Healthcare Czar under President Barack Obama. Before joining the White House, DeParle was a senior advisor and managing director at J. P. Morgan Partners from 2001 to 2009, where she was a member of the Healthcare Group.  Consonance Capital Partners invests in privately owned healthcare companies. The PE fund completed its initial financing at $500 million. and raised its second fund at $856 million in May 2020.

Consonance Capital has public market and private equity professionals immersed in the health sector full-time.

Read more: Different Drum – The Deal Pipeline –  https://web.archive.org/web/20120624052547/http://www.thedeal.com/magazine/ID/041666/dealmakers/different-drum.php#ixzz229qjH1oj

Professional memberships and services
Blutt has held memberships in dozens of associations and committees and served on numerous boards, among them The Michael J. Fox Foundation for Parkinson's Research, which is credited with innovations that streamlined the funding process for scientific research.  He has been the subject of interviews and profiles in the press, is a speaker and has contributed articles to scholarly journals as well as columns on “Intelligent Investing” for Forbes. He is a former trustee of the University of Pennsylvania and of Penn Medicine, the medical school and health system of Penn, of the Brearley School and was on past corporate boards of directors, including Cardinal Health and Fisher Scientific. Currently he is a member of the New York Academy of Medicine; the Board of Advisors, School of Arts and Sciences, University of Pennsylvania; the Board of Advisors of The Wharton School; and the Board of Fellows and Executive Committee of Weill Cornell Medicine, the medical school of Cornell University, where he also co-chairs the Equity, Diversity and Inclusion Committee. Dr. Blutt also serves on the board and Executive Committee of The Commonwealth Fund, a health policy research foundation., where he is also the Chair of the Investment Committee. He is also The Chairman of the University of Pennsylvania's Center for Health Incentives & Behavioral Economics (CHIBE) External Advisory Board. Blutt's philanthropy includes multimillion-dollar contributions to Penn; in 2007 his support was recognized with the School of Medicine's Alumni Service Award.  In 2018 Blutt was awarded the Alumni Award of Merit, the highest award given by the University of Pennsylvania.  Blutt has also supported music at Penn through endowing the Blutt Singer Songwriter Symposium, which has brought such legends to Penn as Lou Reed, Patti Smith, Graham Nash, Rufus Wainwright, Questlove, Nona Hendryx  and Japanese Breakfast.
In addition, Blutt and his wife have endowed three presidential professorships in each of the three schools he attended at Penn. Presidential professorships support faculty from underrepresented minority groups.

Family
Blutt married Margo Krody, a former New York City Ballet dancer in 1993. They have three children: Jill Blutt, a musical performer and artist; Eliza Blutt, a former dancer with New York City Ballet and student; and Emerson Blutt, a student and fencer.

References

Living people
American financiers
American hedge fund managers
American investors
American money managers
American health care chief executives
American stock traders
Physicians from New York (state)
Stock and commodity market managers
University of Pennsylvania alumni
Perelman School of Medicine at the University of Pennsylvania alumni
Wharton School of the University of Pennsylvania alumni
Year of birth missing (living people)